Siby and Sibi are names found independently in several cultures (Africa, Europe and South Asia). Notable people with the name include:

Given name
 Sibi (king), a character in Hindu and Buddhist mythology
 Aliou Siby Badra (born 1971), Ivorian footballer
 Sibi Gwar (born 1987), Nigerian football player
 Sibi Malayil (born 1956), Indian film director
 Sibi Raj, Indian actor
 Siby K. Thomas, Indian screenwriter
 Siby Varghese or Kailash, Indian film actor
 Sibi, a violinist in the 2010 Burkinabé documentary Sibi, l’âme du violon

Surname
 Félix Siby (1942–2006), Gabonese politician
 John Sibi-Okumu, Kenyan actor and journalist
 Mahamé Siby (born 1996), French footballer

See also 
 Sibby, a given name (including a list of people with the name)
 Sibi (disambiguation)
 Siby (disambiguation)